Papyrus 55 (in the Gregory-Aland numbering), signed by 𝔓55, is a copy of the New Testament in Greek. It is a papyrus manuscript of the Gospel of John. The surviving texts of John are verses 1:31-33, 35–38.

The manuscript paleographically has been assigned to the 6th century or the 7th century.

The Greek text of this codex is a representative of the Alexandrian text-type. Aland placed it in Category II.

It is currently housed at the Papyrus Collection of the Austrian National Library (Pap. Vindob. G. 26214) in Vienna.

See also 

 List of New Testament papyri

References

Further reading 

 Peter Sanz, Mitteilungen aus der Papyrussammlung der österreichischen Nationalbibliothek in Wien, N.S., IV (Baden: 1946), pp. 58–59.

New Testament papyri
6th-century biblical manuscripts
Biblical manuscripts of the Austrian National Library
Gospel of John papyri